John George Haslette Vahey (5 March 188115 June 1938) was a versatile and prolific Northern Irish author of detective fiction in the genre's Golden Age in the 1920s and 1930s. Although his work has remained largely out of print since the end of the golden age, he is now enjoying a resurgence of popularity, and some of his work is again in print, or available as e-books.

Early life
Vahey was born in Belfast, Ireland on 5 March 1881, the second son of Herbert Vahey (c. 18396 December 1910), an Inland Revenue Inspector, and Jane Lowry (c. 18502 April 1930), who had married on 20 February 1879, at the Weslyn Church in Donegall Square, Belfast. He attended Foyle College in Derry and was also educated at Hannover.

The 1901 census found Vahey living with his parents at 4 Sydenham Avenue, Victoria, County Down, Ireland. He was an apprentice architect. After four years as an architect's pupil he switched careers and took the exams necessary to become a chartered accountant. He abandoned this career when he started writing fiction, only returning to it during the First World War where he served in Wales as a Corporal in the Army Pay Corps.

Authorship and marriage
The 1911 census found Vahey in lodgings with his elder brother Herbert Lowry Vahey (6 December 18799 January 1958) at Venetian House, Westhill Road, Bournemouth, Hampshire, England. Herbert has continued with architecture, but was also writing both short fiction for the magazines and published two novels in 1911, both with Stanley Paul. The first,A Prisoner in Paradise, about a man who finds his home in the tropics, was favourably received. The second, Camilla Forgetting herself, a story of all conquering love, which was lambasted by the critics.

Vahey had also published short fiction in the magazines and two novels which were very well received. He now recorded his profession as author. Vahey married Gertrude Crowe Barendt (c. 18806 November 1958) on 12 June in Poole, Dorset, England. The couple lived in London after the war, and at 5 Elms Avenue, Hendon, Middlesex, in the mid-1920s, and eventually settled at Branksome Park, in Bournemouth. It is not clear when they moved to Bournemouth, certainly it was in the late 1920s as the electoral register for 1925 found them in Hendon, and by 1931 Vahey had writing to The Observer talking about a grey squirrel raiding a nest that he had seen two years previously in Bournemouth.

Moss reports that the jacket biography on Loder's Two Dead (1934), states that Vahey's initial attempt at writing a novel was when he was in bed convalescent. The same bio make a number of claims: 
Vahey once wrote a novel on a boarding-house table in twenty days, serialised in both England and the US under different names.
He worked very quickly, and thought two hours in the morning quite enough for anyone.
He composed directly on a typewriter, and did not ever re-write.

Writing as John Haslette
Vahey began writing under the name John Haslette derived from joining his first and third given names. He published short magazine fiction and seven novels under this name between 1909 and 1917, when he enlisted in the army. His first novel was The Passion of the President, set in South America and centred abound the political struggle between the President of a country and his bitterest enemy. The book was very well received, judging by the reviewers' quotations in the publisher's display advertisements:
South American Presidents have a way of being embroiled in a breathless game of political check and counter check. In this Mr. Haslette gives a good account of himself, Somebody always has a scrape to get out of, and the puzzled reader is on tenterhooks to see how he will do it. — The Times 
An interesting and effective story of love and intrigue. ... If this is a first novel the author has begun well. — The Globe 
Don Ramon is a personage to be remembered. . . . The book can recommended as a good example of a class of novel that never seems to lose its attraction. — The Outlook 
Mr Haslette's story grips one at once. His name is new to us, but we expect to see it soon again. — Daily Chronicle 
Mr. Haslette writes with as pretty a touch and as engaging a style as one has observed for long time. . . . If a tithe of the novels were turned out in this fashion in literary term, what happy world it would be. — Northern Whig

Five of the John Halsette novels were set in Latin America.

Army service
Vahey enlisted in the Army on 23 July 1917, two months after his brother Hubert had enlisted. Vahey was in the Army Pay Corps in Wales. He was discharged on 14 January 1919 under paragraph 392 XVI of the King's Regulations. This paragraph refers to the discharge of a soldier no longer physically fit for war service. Vahey was awarded a 20% pension based on Debility as a result of sickness. Wales was badly affected by the Spanish Influenza pandemic in late 1918. The age group worst affected by the flu was the 25 to 45 age group. It is not certain that Vahey has debilitated by the Spanish Flu. He was only 38 years-old at the time, so his health must have been seriously compromised to have qualified for such a pension. It is notable the Vahey did not publish a novel again until the mid-1920s, another hint that he had been badly affected by whatever the illness was.

Writing after the First World War
When Vahey started writing again in the 1920s he used his own name and a range of pseudonyms. His initial output was short fiction for magazines like The Cornhill Magazine, or Chambers Journal. Vahey's use of pseudonyms was quite complex, with some pseudonyms restricted to book with a particular publisher. The list of pseudonyms was taken from Gribben, which includes the Timony pseudonym, missing from other sources such as Hubin, and Kemp, but does not include the Varney pseudonym. Vahey's output works will be listed under each of the pseudonyms. It is possible that Vahey used other pseudonyms, or that there are titles that are not listed. 
 

One of the reasons for Vahey's use of pseudonyms become clear when one notes his phenomenal productivity. He published up to seven books a year, necessitating the use of more than one identity. He only wrote seven books in total in his first eight years as a writer, up to 1917.

Writing as John Haslette Vahey
Vahey used his own name (dropping the George) when he began writing books again in 1925. He was very productive, publishing three books in 1925 and four in 1926, using both this own name and the Timony pseudonym. The books under his own name ranged from romances to thrillers and whodunnits, with one western. He also published one illustrated children's book of verse' The New Zoo, and a collection of essays and sketches on fishing, The Humane Angler. Vahey continued to publish books under his own name until 1935.

Writing as Arthur N. Timony
Vahey only used the Timony pseudonym for three novels, published from 1925 to 1928. This pseudonym is sometimes overlooked and while included in the list of Vahey pseudonyms given by Gribben, Neither Hubin nor Kemp include it in their lists of Vahey pseudonyms. The Timony novels were a mixed bag, ranging from thriller to romance. They were not reviewed as positively as some of his other work.

Writing as Anthony Lang
The five Anthony Lang Books were all whodunnits. All were published by Melrose, an example of Vahey keeping a particular pseudonym with a particular publisher.

Writing as George Varney
Vahey seems to have written only two books under the Varney pseudonym. They are a thriller and a whodunnit. This is the most elusive of Vahey's pseudonyms, with relatively few sources identifying it. However the identification is without doubt as Vahey registered copyright in the United States for the books written under this name.

Writing as Vernon Loder
Vahey's most productive pseudonym was that of Vernon Loder. Using this name he published 22 novels, all with Collins. All of those after 1930, when the Collins Crime Club was established, were Crime Club books, for crime novels and as Collins Mystery Novels for the three spy stories featuring Secret Service agent Donald Cairn. The dating of Crime Club issues is taken from the listing for Vernon Loder in Curran's Hooded Gunman: An Illustrated History of Collins Crime Club.

Writing as Walter Proudfoot
The Walter Proudfoot books were mostly thrillers. Two of them feature Inspector Vallence. All of the Proudfoot books were published by Hutchinson over a three-year period from 1931 to 1933.

Writing as John Mowbray
The problem with the John Mowbray pseudonym is that it was also used by Gunby Hadath. John Mowbray were the given names of both Hadath's maternal grandfather Rev. John Mowbray Pearson (11 Feb 180919 July 1850), and a maternal uncle of the same name (fourth quarter of 1838). Fourteen unique titles under this name are listed in The British Library catalogue.

Kemp attributes all of the Mowbray novels to Vahey, but of the five crime stories, only one, Call in the Yard (1931) is now attributed to Vahey by Hubin in his updated Crime Fiction IV: A Comprehensive Bibliography 1749–2000. Edwards says Mowbray had been identified with Hadath until the British Museum (now Library) catalogue firmly declared Mowbray the pseudonym of one J. G. H. Vahey, with no additional proof.  The British Library sometimes indicates pseudonymous authorship unequivocally, as in the case of Harry Collingwood where his books are listed in the catalogue as being authored by Collingwood, Harry, pseud. (i.e. William Joseph Cosens Lancaster.) In the case of John Mowbray, there is now no such unequivocal assignment, it is merely that the year of birth and death are the same as those of Vahey, with Mowbray listed as: Mowbray, John, 1881–1938. This contrasts with the treatment of Mowbray by the British Museum in 1963 where he is described as: Mowbray (John) pseud, (i.e. John George Haslette Vahey.) The British Library Catalogue also gives coincident birth and death dates for John Haslette, Vernon Loder, Henrietta Clandon, Anthony Lang, Walter Proudfoot, and Arthur N. Timony.

The evidence for Hadath's authorship of the books by John Mowbray is as follows:
The Mowbray novels, with one exception, are all juvenile fiction, whereas all the books published by Vahey under his other pseudonyms, with two exceptions are adult thriller, crime novels and romances (and often combine all there). The only juvenile book definitively by Vahey was The New Zoo, an illustrated book of verse for younger children.
The pseudonym, John Mowbray, like the other two pseudonyms which Hadath used for published books, can be found in his family tree.
Some of the school novels by Mowbray share characters with novels by Hadath. 
Some of the Mowbray novels are situated near where Hadath spent his summers.
The plots of the school novels are common (unjustly accused boys, initial conflict ending in friendship) etc. with many of Hadath's works. Kirkpatrick noted that the Mowbray school stories are similar to those written by Hadath 
Reviewers praise the same facets in Mowbray's school stories that they do in Hadath's, his realism.

Hubin's bibliography of crime fiction in 1984 listed five titles as being by Vahey,  using the pseudonym John Mowbray. These were
Call the Yard. Skeffington, 1931 
The Frontier Mystery. Collins, 1940 
The Megeve Mystery. Collins, 1941 
On Secret Service. Collins, 1939 
The Radio Mystery. Collins, 1941 
A sixth title, The Way of the Weasel. Partridge, 1922 was listed as being a questionable inclusion.

Of these titles:
Only one of these, Call in the Yard is an adult novel, and this is the only one now attributed to Vahey by Hubin in his updated Crime Fiction IV: A Comprehensive Bibliography 1749–2000. This attribution is correct as Vahey registered his copyright of this novel in the United States, as he generally did with his books. 
The next four titles were juvenile fiction, were all published after Vahey's death in 1938, and in most cases had plots centred on the Second World War, which began more than a year after Vahey had died. 
The Way of the Weasel is a public-school story about a boy nicknamed The Weasel.

Writing as Henrietta Clandon
All of the Clandon novels were published by Geoffrey Bles who was known for his flair in discovering writing talent. This is another example of Vahey working with a single publisher for a particular pseudonym. The Clandon novels are all Whodunnits, although the last, and the last book published by Vahey, features spies. This was at the end of the 1930s when the world was inexorably moving towards war. This was something that could be seen across the pseudonyms, with more spy stories featuring in Vahey's output.

Death and legacy
Vahey died on 15 June 1938. He was living at Flat 4, Reedley, Lindsay Road, Bournemouth, His widow was his executor and his estate was valued at just over £950. His widow survived him by a little more than 20 years, dying in Bournemouth on 6 November 1958,at 89 years of age.

Vahey was an amazingly prolific author. He published 59 books in the period 19251938, an average of over four a year. All but two of these were novels. This is a staggering output, because not only did he have to write the books, but also had all the usual back and forth correspondence on edits, proofs, covers, rights, serialisation etc. consumes a lot of time. On top of his, he was also producing shorter fiction for newspapers and magazines. His work as Loder was of high quality, as the Collins Crime Club was selective. Similarly his writing as Henrietta Clandon was quite well regarded, and four of the Clandon books have now been reissued as e-books. Two of the Loder novels have been reissued by Collins.

Moss states that: Loder never quite achieved the first rank of detective novelists, and has received scant attention in commentaries of the genre. Nonetheless, he was a popular, dependable author in the 1930s, and better than many; perhaps a paradigm of the English Golden Age mystery writer. Kemp states that Vahey matured into a competent hack writer.  In the reviews of his work phrases like competent, craftsman, and well-drawn character frequently appear. Vahey had remained out of print since the 1930s, but is now starting to creep back as he is out of copyright. Six of his novels are currently available as commercial e-books, and three more are on archival sites.

In the preface to the first Vernon Loder novel published, the editor of the Collins Detective Story Club wrote that: Mr Vernon Loder is one of the most promising recruits to the ranks of detective story writers . . . He certainly knows how to provide a mystery baffling enough to satisfy the most exacting reader. In 2018 Moss hoped that the reissue of some of the Loder books would help Vahey to be: rediscovered and enjoyed by a new wider readership.

Notes

References

External links
Death of an Editor on the Hathi Trust archival site.
The Mesh on the Hathi Trust archival site.
Desmond Rourke, Irishman on the Internet Archive site.

1881 births
1938 deaths
Irish fiction writers
British detective fiction writers
20th-century British novelists
Irish male novelists
Writers from Belfast
People educated at Foyle College
British Army personnel of World War I
Royal Army Pay Corps soldiers